Liu Fang (born 1974) is a Chinese musician and pipa virtuoso.

Liu Fang may also refer to:

People
Empress Liu (Liu Yao's third empress) (fl. 326), personal name Liu Fang, an empress during the Former Zhao dynasty
Liu Fang, a Sui general who conquered northern Vietnam
Liu Fang, an official of the Kingdom of Wei

Locations
Liu Fang, Boon Lay, a subzone in Boon Lay, Singapore
Liufang Station, a Beijing Subway station in Beijing, China